Michael Lynch (1944 – July 9, 1991) was an American-born Canadian professor, journalist, and activist, most noted as a pioneer of gay studies in Canadian academia and as an important builder of many significant LGBT rights and HIV/AIDS organizations in Toronto.

Born and raised in Harnett County, North Carolina, he studied at Goddard College and the University of Iowa. He wrote his doctoral dissertation on the poetry of Wallace Stevens. He moved to Toronto in 1971 with his then-wife Gail Jones, and from 1971 to 1990 he taught in the Department of English at the University of Toronto at both the main and Erindale College campuses.

After coming out as a gay man in 1973, Lynch was a writer and a contributing editor for The Body Politic. In 1974, he taught the first gay studies course offered at a Canadian university, through the University of Toronto's School of Continuing Education. He was a founding member of the Toronto chapter of Gay Alliance Toward Equality and the Gay Academic Union. In 1980, he convened the first academic conference on the topic of Walt Whitman's 1880 visit to London, Ontario. He helped found the Toronto Centre for Lesbian and Gay Studies, which continues to offer an annual academic grant in his name.

Lynch was a committed AIDS activist from the dawn of the AIDS crisis in 1981 until his death in 1991, including as a founding member of AIDS Action Now!, the AIDS Committee of Toronto and the AIDS Memorial in Toronto's Barbara Hall Park.

In 1989 he published the poetry collection These Waves of Dying Friends.

At the time of his death, he had an unfinished gay studies manuscript, The Age of Adhesiveness: From Friendship to Homosexuality, in development. The book was an expansion of an earlier academic paper, for which he won Crompton-Noll Award from the Lesbian and Gay Caucus of the Modern Languages Association in 1981. He also served as the editor of the Lesbian and Gay Caucus's Gay Studies Newsletter.

Honours and awards 
In honour of his role as a significant contributor to LGBT culture and history in Canada, a portrait of Lynch by Gerald Hannon is held by The ArQuives: Canada's LGBTQ2+ Archives' National Portrait Collection.

A biography of Lynch, AIDS Activist: Michael Lynch and the Politics of Community, was published by Ann Silversides in 2003.

References

External links
 Michael Lynch fonds - Archival records at The ArQuives: Canada's LGBTQ2+ Archives

1944 births
1991 deaths
20th-century Canadian poets
20th-century Canadian male writers
AIDS-related deaths in Canada
American emigrants to Canada
Canadian male poets
Canadian non-fiction writers
Canadian gay writers
Goddard College alumni
Canadian LGBT journalists
LGBT people from North Carolina
Canadian LGBT poets
Canadian LGBT rights activists
LGBT studies academics
People from Harnett County, North Carolina
Writers from North Carolina
Writers from Toronto
University of Iowa alumni
Academic staff of the University of Toronto
Canadian male non-fiction writers
Gay academics
20th-century non-fiction writers
20th-century Canadian LGBT people
Gay poets
Canadian LGBT academics